Millinocket Municipal Airport  is a town-owned, public-use airport located one nautical mile (2 km) southeast of the central business district of Millinocket, a town in Penobscot County, Maine, United States. It once offered commercial airline service on Northeast Airlines.

Facilities and aircraft 
It has two asphalt paved runways: 11/29 measuring 4,713 x 100 feet (1,437 x 30 m) and 16/34 measuring 4,008 x 100 feet (1,222 x 30 m).

For the 12-month period ending August 18, 2006, the airport had 7,700 aircraft operations, an average of 21 per day: 82% general aviation, 13% military and 5% air taxi. At that time there were 15 aircraft based at this airport: 93% single-engine and 7% ultralight.

See also 
 Millinocket Seaplane Base

References

External links 
 Millinocket Municipal Airport
 West Branch Aviation
 

Airports in Penobscot County, Maine
Millinocket, Maine